League1 Ontario (L1O) is a semi-professional men's soccer league in Ontario, Canada. The league began play in 2014 and is sanctioned by the Canadian Soccer Association and the Ontario Soccer Association as a pro-am league in the Canadian soccer league system. As of the 2023 season, L1O includes 21 teams. Beginning in 2024, the league will become a three-tier league featuring promotion and relegation.

In the Canadian soccer league system, the men's division is behind the Canadian Premier League (CPL). It is part of League1 Canada, the national third tier with regional division, with L1O equaivalent to the Première ligue de soccer du Québec (PLSQ) and League1 British Columbia (L1BC). The league champion qualifies for the Canadian Championship, the domestic cup championship, for the following season. Dino Rossi serves as the commissioner of the league.

History

League1 Ontario was founded on November 15, 2013, in an announcement by the Ontario Soccer Association (OSA) that it would pilot the semi-professional league in 2014 and 2015 as a key pillar of long-term player development in Canada. The league would be administered by DG Sports, who also operate the province's amateur Ontario Soccer League, with Dino Rossi serving as commissioner. OSA President Ron Smale stated that the league's core group of players are to consist of U-23s, with League1 complementing the newly formed Ontario Player Development League (OPDL) elite youth league as a pathway for professional player development.

On April 8, 2014, the OSA revealed its plans for the inaugural season of League1 which would begin during the final weekend in May 2014. The season featured 10 teams, chosen through a standards-based application process, which were: ANB Futbol, Durham Power FC, Internacional de Toronto, Kingston Cataraqui Clippers, Master's FA, Sigma FC, Toronto FC Academy, Vaughan Azzurri, Windsor Stars and Woodbridge Strikers. The league champion would face the champion of the Première ligue de soccer du Québec in the Inter-Provincial Cup to determine the national Division III champion.

Dylan Sacramento of Toronto FC Academy scored the first ever goal in the league with a 10th-minute strike against Vaughan Azzurri. In the same game, Mateo Restrepo received the league's first red card. On July 22, 2014, the league and the Ontario Soccer Association announced the termination of Internacional de Toronto's license agreement due to "failure to comply with agreed-upon league standards," with league matches rescheduled for the season to accommodate the change. Toronto FC Academy were crowned the inaugural league champions on October 4, 2014, after defeating the Cataraqui Clippers 3–1 to secure the top place in the regular season standings. Vaughan Azzurri and Sigma FC contested the inaugural League1 Cup on October 19, 2014, at BMO Field, with the Azzurri winning the single-game cup final 2–1 to be crowned champions.

As the number of teams in the league continued to grow through expansion, the league introduced a two-conference format with the winner of each conference facing off in a championship match. After the 2016 season, the Inter-Provincial Cup was cancelled, with the winners of League1 Ontario and the PLSQ instead advancing to the national Canadian Championship the following season, beginning in 2018.

In 2018, the league returned to a single division, introducing playoffs for the top finishers of the league to decide the league champion. The League Cup tournament was eliminated the following season.

On November 14, 2018, the Canadian Premier League announced its purchase of League1 Ontario. According to L1O commissioner Dino Rossi, L1O would serve as "CPL's official development league."

Due to restrictions associated with the COVID-19 pandemic, the league cancelled the 2020 season and delayed the start of the 2021 season.

On January 25, 2022, League1 Ontario announced a major restructuring of the men's and women's competitions to commence in 2024. The league will be split into three tiers (Premier, Championship, and League2) with promotion and relegation between the tiers.
Future expansion clubs will enter at the League2 level and will have to win to earn promotion to the Championship and then Premier divisions. Also in 2024 will be the return of the L1 Cup, a league cup knockout tournament which will feature teams from all three tiers in the L1O system.

Competition format

The League1 Ontario regular season runs from May through October using a single table format, with each team playing one match against all other teams. The top eight teams compete in the league playoffs at the end of the season. Since 2017, the league champion has qualified for the Canadian Championship.

Beginning in 2019, the Supporters Trophy was created by the Rogue Street Elite supporter group of North Mississauga SC to be given to the regular season champions.

L1 Cup
The L1 Cup is a league cup tournament that features all L1O clubs. It runs concurrently with the regular season, with cup games usually taking place mid-week. It is not a form of playoffs and all matches are separate from the regular season and are not reflected in the season standings. The 2014 and 2015 cups included a group stage and a knockout stage but from 2016 to 2018 the format was a single-elimination tournament. Following a hiatus from 2019 to 2023, the L1 Cup will return in 2024 to coincide with the league's restructuring.

Yearly results

Clubs

Current clubs
Of the 22 current clubs, 3 are based in Toronto, 11 are based elsewhere in the Greater Toronto Area, and the rest are based in other cities in Southern Ontario. There are no clubs based in Northern Ontario.

Former clubs

Timeline

Organization

Regulations
League1 Ontario was founded with a series of values, objectives and standards all aimed at furthering the league's stated objective of improving player development in Ontario and Canada. Some of these regulations include:
 Standards-based club licensing, renewed annually (not a franchise/ownership model). Standards include technical, organizational, facility and financial criteria.
 Maximum of 3 non-Canadian players per club.
 18-man game day rosters must include a minimum of 8 U-23 players.
 Starting 11 must include a minimum of 4 U-23 players.
 Maximum of 5 substitutions per match.

Reserve division
In 2019, L1O launched a men's U21 Reserve Division open to existing League1 Ontario or Ontario Player Development League license holders. The inaugural year will consist of a 12-game summer season and a separate 10-game fall season. Nine teams will participate in the 2019 summer season with a possibility of more teams joining for the fall.

Players who earned national team caps while in L1O
The following players have earned a senior national team cap while playing in League1 Ontario (the year of their first cap while playing in the league is listed). Players who earned caps before or after playing in League1 Ontario are not included, unless they also earned caps while in the league. This section also does not include youth caps (U23 or below).

See also

 Canadian soccer league system
 League1 Alberta
 League1 British Columbia
 Première ligue de soccer du Québec
 USL League Two
 League1 Ontario (women)

References

External links
 

 
Soccer leagues in Canada
Can
Soccer leagues in Ontario
Sports leagues established in 2013
2013 establishments in Ontario
Professional sports leagues in Canada
League1 Canada